Winchester School of Art is the art school of the University of Southampton, situated 10 miles (14 km) north of Southampton in the city of Winchester near the south coast of England.

History
The Winchester School of Art was founded in 1870, and originally occupied Winchester's twelfth-century Wolvesey Castle. In 1895 it moved to new premises in the Kings Court wing of Winchester Guildhall. In 1962 it was granted new buildings, which it still occupies. In 1996, the School merged with the University of Southampton.

Textile Conservation Centre
The Textile Conservation Centre was a specialist centre for research and training founded in 1975 by Karen Finch at Hampton Court Palace. Between 1998 and 2009 the centre was merged with the University of Southampton and housed from 1999 in a purpose-designed building at the Winchester School of Art. In April 2009, it was announced that the University of Southampton had decided to close the Textile Conservation Centre on 31 October 2009, prompting widespread concern from academics and historians. The programme is now part of the Kelvin Centre for Conservation and Cultural Heritage Research (former Centre for Textile Conservation) at the University of Glasgow, where it opened in autumn 2010.

Notable alumni 
 Darren Almond, artist
John Buckley, sculptor
 James Castle, sculptor
 Stephen Chambers, artist
Diana Copperwhite, painter
 Brian Eno, musician, record producer, visual artist and theorist 
 Mary Fairburn, artist
 Jasmine Guinness, studied printmaking, became a model
 Emma Hartley, painter
 Paul Lee, artist
 Margaret Graeme Niven, painter.
 Mick O'Dea, artist
 Katie Pratt, artist
 Geoffrey Richardson, musician
 Linda Sutton, painter
 Stella Tennant, studied sculpture, became a model

References

External links
 Winchester School of Art
 Graphic Arts Showcase Site 08/09

Educational institutions established in 1870
1870 establishments in England
University of Southampton
Art schools in England
Education in Hampshire
School of Art